Arturo Barba (born 21 May 1973) is a Mexican actor and producer known for appearing in telenovelas and movies. He was born in Mexico City, Distrito Federal, Mexico.

Filmography

Film roles

Television

Awards and nominations

References

External links 

Mexican male telenovela actors
Mexican male film actors
Male actors from Mexico City
20th-century Mexican male actors
21st-century Mexican male actors
Living people
1973 births